The Delay is a 2012 Uruguayan drama film directed by Rodrigo Plá. The film was selected as the Uruguayan entry for the Best Foreign Language Oscar at the 85th Academy Awards, but it did not make the final shortlist.

Cast
 Roxana Blanco as María
 Carlos Vallarino as Agustin
 Oscar Pernas as Nestor
 Cecilia Baranda
 Thiago Segovia
 Facundo Segovia

See also
 List of submissions to the 85th Academy Awards for Best Foreign Language Film
 List of Uruguayan submissions for the Academy Award for Best Foreign Language Film

References

External links
 

2012 films
2012 drama films
2010s Spanish-language films
Uruguayan drama films